Symmoca deprinsi is a moth of the family Autostichidae. It is found in Asia Minor.

The  length of the forewings is 17 mm for males and 19 mm for females. The male forewing ground colour is dirty white, becoming yellowish towards all margins. The cellular dot, plical dot and discocellular dots are coffee brown. The hindwings are shiny sericeous (silky) white. Females are uniformly yellowish (a deeper tint than the males). The pattern consists only of one or two light brownish scales.

Etymology
The species is dedicated to lepidopterist Mr. W. De Prins.

References

Moths described in 2001
Symmoca
Insects of Turkey